The Board for Standardization of the Serbian Language is a linguistic institute in Serbia, Montenegro and Republika Srpska whose purpose is to preserve and foster the Serbian variety of the Serbo-Croatian language. It was founded on 12 December 1997 in Belgrade, then in Yugoslavia.

The founders of the board are:
Serbian Academy of Sciences and Arts (SANU)
Montenegrin Academy of Sciences and Arts (CANU)
Academy of Sciences and Arts of the Republika Srpska (ANURS)
Matica srpska
The Institute for the Serbian language in Belgrade
Faculty of Philology of the University of Belgrade
Faculty of Philology of the University of Priština
Faculty of Philosophy of the University of Novi Sad 
Faculty of Philosophy of the University of Banja Luka 
Faculty of Philosophy of the University of East Sarajevo 
Faculty of Philosophy of the University of Niš 
Faculty of Philosophy of the University of Montenegro in Nikšić
University of Kragujevac
Serbian Literary Guild in Belgrade

References

External links 
 Webpage devoted to the Board, in the Rastko Project 

Serbian language
Language policy in Bosnia and Herzegovina, Croatia, Montenegro and Serbia